B. Monkey is a British-American 1998 crime drama film directed by Michael Radford. Originally, Michael Caton-Jones was attached to direct the adaptation of the homonymous 1992 book by Andrew Davies, but left over creative differences.

Plot

Alan (Jared Harris) is a schoolteacher in London who also moonlights as a jazz disc jockey for a hospital PA system.  One night after work, he goes to a bar and sees Beatrice (Asia Argento) a beautiful woman who is arguing with two men. Alan is immediately captivated by Beatrice and begins to pursue her. What Alan doesn't know is that Beatrice is an infamous thief known to the police as "B. Monkey" (named for her ability to break into anything) and the men she was arguing with were Paul (Rupert Everett) and Bruno (Jonathan Rhys Meyers) a homosexual couple who are her partners in crime. When Alan becomes aware of Beatrice's secret, he tries to lead her into a safer and more honest way of life, even as she lures him into the thrilling existence he's been dreaming of.

Cast
Asia Argento as Beatrice/B. Monkey
Jared Harris as Alan Furnace
Rupert Everett as Paul Neville
Jonathan Rhys Meyers as Bruno
Julie T. Wallace as Mrs. Sturge
Ian Hart as Steve Davis
Tim Woodward as Frank Rice
Bryan Pringle as Goodchild

Production
In her autobiography, Asia Argento said she had an affair with director Michael Radford during filming. She had earlier accused Harvey Weinstein of sexually assaulted her during the same time period.

Reception
Film review aggregator website Rotten Tomatoes gave the film a rating of 60% based on 20 reviews. Metacritic has the film listed as a 49 out of 100, indicating mixed reviews, based on 10 critics.

Anita Gates of The New York Times had a mixed review of the film but thought highly of the actors:

Soundtrack
 "Billets Doux" performed by Django Reinhardt
 "De Camptown Races"
 "They Can't Take That Away from Me" performed by Peggy Lee
 "Trash" performed by Suede
 "Souvenirs" performed by Django Reinhardt
 "Love Anybody You Want" performed by Barcode
 "Life Goes On and On" performed by 9 Lazy 9
 "Two Hearts Entwine"
 "Glory Box" performed by Portishead
 "Imagination" performed by Chet Baker
 "Look Who's Perfect Now" performed by Transistor
 "You're the First, the Last, My Everything" performed by Barry White
 "Chinese Burn" performed by Curve
 "I'm goin round in circles" performed by Jimmy Witherspoon
 "Tarantelle del Gargano" performed by La Nuova Compagnia di Canto Popolare
 "D'Amour L'ardent Flamme" performed by The Wiener Volksopernorchester
 "Sweet Jane" performed by Cowboy Junkies
 "Tupelo Honey" performed by Cassandra Wilson

Creative differences
In October 2017, Michael Caton-Jones revealed that he had chosen Sophie Okonedo, to star. However, the producer, Harvey Weinstein, decided the actress wasn't "fuckable". Caton-Jones and Weinstein discussed the matter heatedly, and Caton-Jones said, "'Don't screw up the casting of this film because you want to get laid', whereupon he went mental." Weinstein then leaked to Variety that Caton-Jones had walked off the movie due to "creative differences". Argento, who replaced Okonedo, was one of three women who in 2017 were reported in The New Yorker to have been raped by Weinstein; she said that she submitted to Weinstein because, "I felt I had to, because I had the movie coming out and I didn't want to anger him."

References

External links
 
 
 

1998 films
British crime films
British LGBT-related films
Films based on British novels
Films shot in Paris
Films shot in England
Films scored by Luis Bacalov
1998 crime films
1990s English-language films
1998 LGBT-related films
Films directed by Michael Radford
1990s British films